The Cistercian Abbey of Roermond or Munsterabdij was a Cistercian nunnery in Roermond that existed from 1224 to 1797 and of which the Munsterkerk is the only physical remnant.

History

Name
The name Munsterabdij — at the end of the 18th century Abdije Munster —  is formed by the words abdij, abbey, and munster, which comes from the Latin monasterium, itself meaning monastery. It was originally called the Monastery of the Blessed Virgin Mary (Dutch: Klooster van de Heilige Maagd Maria).

Monastery foundation and history until 1797
The official foundation of the monastery can be established on 16 June 1224. That is when, in the presence of the papal legate Conrad van Urach, the foundation deed was signed by Gerard III, Count of Guelders, and his wife, Margaret of Brabant. However, this signing was only a legal formality, as the monastery had been established in Roermond several years earlier, from 1218. The monastery church was incorporated in the Cistercian order in 1220, although the building might not have been completed by then. It was consecrated by the Archbishop of Cologne. The first abbess was Richardis of Bavaria, widow of Count Otto I of Guelders and mother of Gerard III. At her request, the abbot of Kamp was appointed visitor by the pope. She died in 1231 and was buried in the abbey.

On 18 February 1797, the sisters were forced to leave the convent by the French. Seven remaining nuns then moved in with one Mrs. Luitjens, but later all returned to their parental home. The last abbess of the abbey, Maria Josepha de Broich, died in Roermond on 8 February 1808.

List of abbesses of the Munster Abbey
Richardis of Bavaria (from 1222 held the title of abbess)
Elisabeth of Guelders
Oda of Jülich
Clementina of Guelders
Agnes van Herpen
Elisabeth van Swalmen
Gertrude van Ravenach
Fritswindis van Swalmen
Bela van Malbourg
Bertha van Driel
Margaret van Elmpt
Mary van Driel
Bela van Mirlaer van Millendonck (abbess from 1447)
Aleidis van Bommel
Wilhelmina van Kessel (also called Wilhelmina de Kessel; fl. 15th century)
Bela van Dript
Jacoba van Erp
Agnes van Barick
Elisabeth van Flodrop
Anna van Barick
Agnes van Imstenraede
Anna van Ruyschenbergh
Susanna van Pardo
Adama van Egeren
Hermanna van Poll
Francisca d'Alsace Bossu
Maria Margaretha de Wijenhorst ex Donck
Adriana (or Adrienne) Albertina de Rheede de Saesvelt (abbess 1705–1728)
Anna Francisca van der Heyden, called Belderbusch
Maria Cecilia van Eyck (died 12 April 1771)
Maria Josepha de Broich (abbess until 1797; died 8 February 1808).

Monastic buildings

The Munsterkerk, today a parish church, is the only remnant of the monastery. Originally on the south side of this church there was a cloister with the refectory, chapter house, palace hall (?) and, on the first floor, the dormitory. West of the Munsterkerk, where the music kiosk now stands on Munsterplein, originally stood the abbesses' house, which is mentioned as early as 1293. There was a building on Hamstraat, which probably served as a guest house. The large gate, which gave access to the monastery grounds, was also located on the same Hamstraat.

During the French occupation, the abbess house was used as a prison while the other buildings served as barracks. When the prison was moved elsewhere in the middle of the 19th century, the abbess house and some other dilapidated buildings were demolished to make way for a public park. What remained of the other buildings was demolished in 1924, despite a fierce rescue by priest and history expert Mgr. Van Gils.

References

Cistercian nunneries in the Netherlands
Buildings and structures in Roermond
Monasteries dissolved during the French Revolution
Burial sites of the House of Wassenberg
Burial sites of the House of Wittelsbach